The women's 5 kilometres walk event at the 1989 Summer Universiade was held in Duisburg on 29 August 1989. It was the last time that this distance was contested at the Universiade before being replaced with 10 kilometres in 1991.

Results

References

Athletics at the 1989 Summer Universiade
1989